Fendt 700 Vario is a series of tractors made by the manufacturer Fendt. Since the introduction of the first 700 Vario model in 1989, seven generations of the series have been released. The 700 Vario is the best-selling tractor of the manufacturer. The latest generation, the Fendt 700 Vario Gen7, has been available on the market since the summer of 2022.

Series
The 700 Vario series has been available since 1998. Among the larger Fendt models, 800 Vario to 1100 Vario MT and the compact machines of the 200 Vario, 300 Vario and 500 Vario series, the 700 Vario is considered particularly versatile. The series is the best-selling model of Fendt and the most popular tractor in Germany.

Since its official presentation in 1998, the drive, technology and equipment of the Fendt 700 Vario have been consistently further developed. In total, there are seven generations of the series. Each generation includes four to six different models, which mainly differ in performance and horsepower. Currently, the 700 Vario Gen6 models and the tractors of the latest generation 700 Vario Gen7 are still being produced. Due to their durability and long lifespan, older Fendt 700 generations are still available as used machines on the market.

Fendt pursues the approach of combining a comfortable and user-friendly operation with a versatile range of functions with the 700 Vario series. The innovative operating system Variotronic, which was introduced with the introduction of the first 700 Vario generation in 1998, has been awarded internationally.

Since 2011, all tractors of the fourth generation have been equipped with Fendt Efficient Technology (FET) and the VisioPlus cab for safe and comfortable work. In 2020, the FendtOne operating system was introduced with the sixth generation. In response to global demand, the available track widths of the tractor models have been adjusted. Also, all Fendt 700 Vario models currently built comply with the European exhaust emission standard stage V.

Generations and Models

The latest generation
The seventh generation series includes five models (720, 722, 724, 726 and 728 Vario) with a power range of 149 – 208 kW and 203 - 303 HP. As with previous generations, the focus of the Gen7 is a low power-to-weight ratio and high-performance range—however, the new models have been visually and technically overhauled. For the first time, a Deutz engine was not used, but a 6-cylinder engine by AGCO Power with 7.5 litres of displacement and 1,220 Nm. The fans, transmission and drive have also been renewed in the Gen7 models. The Fendt VarioDrive drive for automatic shifting of the driving ranges from the 1000 Vario series has now been integrated into the new 700 Vario models.

The compact cooling unit with the Concentric Air System (CAS) cooling concept is a new feature. The slim design allows for a large steering angle and makes the Fendt 700 Vario Gen7 particularly manoeuvrable. All models also have integrated hood and rear cameras as well as the integrated safety concept Fendt Stability Control, which reduces side inclination and swaying even with heavy loads. In addition, there is an integrated tire pressure control VarioGrip.
From late 2023, the Fendt 700 Vario Gen7 will be optionally available with a new trailer brake assistant.

External links
 Fendt 700 Vario on the homepage of the manufacturer
 Product brochure of Fendt 700 Vario

References

Tractors